Tangeh Narreh (also known as Tang Narreh) is a village in Aliabad Rural District, Khafr District, Jahrom County, Fars Province, Iran. At the 2006 census, its population was 14, in 4 families.

References 

Populated places in  Jahrom County